Variyar (also written as Variar, Varyar, Warriar or Warrier) is a Hindu Ambalavasi caste in Kerala, India.

Etymology

The term Variyar has its origin in the Malayalam word 'Variyam' ( /വാര്യം), which refers to a committee or a board. Variyam refers to an office of supervision.  Thus variyar is a supervising officer or a member of a supervisory board or committee. The word is commonly used in the plural form as Variar (Varian + -ar) to denote respect.  The feminine equivalent of Variar is Varassyar. It is a combination of Variyassi/Variaththi and the plural suffix -ar.

People 
Notable people called Variar, Variyar, or Warrier include
 CBC Warrier – Ex-Member of Legislative Assembly (Kerala)
 Ikkanda Warrier (1890–1977) – the first and the last Prime Minister of the state of Cochin, India, beginning in 1948.
 Gopi Warrier – pseudoscientist specialising in Ayurvedic medicine, playwright and poet.
 Jayaraj Warrier – Actor
 Madhu Warrier – actor and producer, brother of Manju Warrier
 Manju Warrier – an Indian actress and dancer in the Malayalam film industry.
 Mridula Warrier – playback singer.
 N. V. Krishna Warrier – an Indian poet, journalist, scholar, academician and political thinker.
 P. K. R. Warrier – a cardiothoracic surgeon, author and social activist.
 P. K. Warrier – Indian Ayurvedic physician.
 Priya Prakash Varrier – Actress and Model
 Rajan Warrier – Infamous missing persons' case
 Rajashree Warrier – Bharata Natyam dancer.
 Ramapurathu Warrier -pioneer of the "Vanchipattu" or Boat-song form of poetry in Malayalam language.
 Sachin Warrier – playback singer and composer in the Malayalam cinema industry.
 Sankarankutty Sandeep Warrier – an Indian first-class cricketer.
 Sankara Variyar – an astronomer-mathematician of the Kerala school of astronomy and mathematics.
 Shashi Warrier – author.
 Shobha Warrier, a journalist
 Unnayi Variyar – poet, writer, scholar, dramatist who lived in Kerala during the later part of the 17th century.

See also
Ambalavasi

References

Kerala society
Social groups of Kerala
Indian castes